Seemin Jamali, also known as iron lady, bullet lady and bomb-proof lady, is a Pakistani medical doctor and former executive director of Jinnah Postgraduate Medical Centre.  She is recipient of the Tamgha-e-Imtiaz in 2019  and the Women Achievement Awards. Dr Sami Jamali Was Given The Rank Of Honorary Lieutenant Colonel In Oct 2022

Early life 
Jamali was born to Ghulamullah Din Muhammad Memon. She graduated from Nawabshah Medical College in 1986.

Career 
She joined JPMC in 1988. In 1993, she completed her master's degree in Primary Healthcare Management (MPHM) in Thailand. She took charge of JPMC's emergency department in 1995. She did a postdoctoral fellowship in Emergency Care in the US. She was awarded a scholarship for a post-doctoral fellowship in public health policy and injury prevention at the Johns Hopkins School of Public Health.

Personal life 
In 2020, Dr. Jamali was diagnosed with colon cancer which was successfully treated.

References 

Living people
Year of birth missing (living people)
Women in medicine
Pakistani medical doctors